LA Femme International Film Festival focuses on platforming women filmmakers, "by women, for everyone". The Festival was created in 2005, to answer the need to enhance women behind the camera as directors, producers, and writers. It was the first women-focused festival in Los Angeles. To meet the festival objectives of showcasing and promoting commercially viable films by women filmmakers, the organization offers mentorships, creates dialogues among creators, holds panels, and assists with finding distribution opportunities.

History 
The film was founded by Leslie LaPage, after attending Sundance Festival 2005, and remarking on the fact that there were very few films by women. LaPage found it difficult to find sponsors, because, in her words, "almost no one in Los Angeles seemed to believed that women could direct anything other than a romantic comedy." But the event was mounted, and 25 films were screened in the 2-day festival. Since then, the festival has grown to include over 100 films screened over four days, in two theaters, and it includes seminars, panels, networking mixers, and gala events.

Awards

Winners 
Some of the major awards granted at LA Femme Film Festival include:

See also 
 List of women's film festivals

References

External links 
 
 

Women's film festivals in the United States
Film festivals in Los Angeles
Film festivals established in 2005
History of women in California
Women in Los Angeles